MagicTracer is a proprietary Microsoft Windows computer application for doing raster to vector conversion. This program has the capability to automatically convert raster images to vector output. There are over 100 functions that can be used to further customize and fine-tune the conversion results.

See also
Auto-tracing
Raster to vector
Raster to vector conversion software

External links
Archived Official Web [2005]

Windows-only software
Graphics software
GIS software
Raster to vector conversion software